Karen Price is an American model, stunt actress and television producer.

Karen Price may refer to:

 Karen Price (cricketer) (born 1955), Australian cricketer
 Karen Price (murder victim)
Karen Price, character played by Faith Ford